Jurgen Ziewe is a German artist, designer, and out-of-body experiencer.

Biography
Ziewe trained as an artist at The Hamburg Academy of Art. He moved to England in 1975 and worked as a designer at multiple agencies. He also produced abstract paintings. Ziewe now produces computer art, employing fractal elements. His influences include the archetypes of Carl Jung, and his work has featured on fantasy posters, greeting cards, and science fiction book covers for authors including Vernor Vinge and Peter F. Hamilton. In 1997 a book showcasing his work, entitled New Territories, was published.

Ziewe sees dream-like states as being another form of reality. By his own account, he has since 1975 had out-of-body experiences and interactions with interdimensional beings in other dimensions of existence, accessed via meditation and lucid dreaming.

Bibliography

References

External links
 Jurgen Ziewe 3D Illustrations
 Jurgen Ziewe - Fine Art
 Interview with Jurgen Ziewe

German speculative fiction artists
Fantasy artists
Science fiction artists
German digital artists
German illustrators
Living people
Year of birth missing (living people)